The Lithuanian Rugby Federation, abbreviated to LRF is the governing body for the sport of rugby union in Lithuania. Lithuania currently comprises 1,650 registered players and there are 15 club in the whole country.

The Lithuanian national rugby union team currently holds the record for most test match wins in a row (17 matches) along with New Zealand and South Africa.

History
It was formed in 1961, yet was not considered by European rugby authorities and World rugby authorities as a national rugby federation as Lithuania at the time we part of the USSR.

It became affiliated to the International Rugby Football Board, now known as World Rugby, in 1993 and to FIRA Europe, now known as Rugby Europe in 1991 as soon as the USSR collapsed.

See also
 Rugby union in Lithuania
 Lithuania national rugby union team
 Lithuania national rugby sevens team
 Lithuania women's national rugby sevens team

External links
  

Rugby union in Lithuania
Rugby union governing bodies in Europe
Rugby
Sports organizations established in 1961